Mamintal "Bombit" Alonto Adiong Jr. (born March 17, 1965) is a Filipino politician who currently serve as the governor of the province of Lanao del Sur from 2007 to 2016, and from 2019 up to present.

He was born to a powerful political family, and was raised in local Lanao del Sur politics. He is the eldest son of Former Lanao del Sur Governor Mamintal Adiong Sr. and Bae Soraya Alonto Adiong. His brothers are former Regional Acting Governor Ansaruddin Alonto Adiong and Lanao del Sur 1st District Assemblyman Zia Alonto Adiong of the Autonomous Region on Muslim Mindanao. His father was largely credited for the landslide victory of President Gloria Macapagal Arroyo and her slate in the 2004 elections.

Family

Married to Raifa Sani Raki-in, he is the father of former Lanao del Sur Sangguniang Kabataan Provincial President Mamintal  Adiong III (2007–10), former Sangguniang Kabataan Provincial President Mohammad Khalid Adiong (2010–13) and Soraya Harifa.

Political career

Adiong started his career in local governance in 1996 as an appointed board member, and was elected to the same position in 1998. In 2001, he went on to become the province's sports officer and concurrently appointed as the Provincial Administrator of Lanao del Sur by his father, Governor Mamintal Adiong Sr., the Governor of the province during that time. But on 2004, weeks after the 2004 Philippines elections, his father died from cardiac arrest. In 2003, he assumed the OIC provincial engineer position. His stint in the private sector—as CEO of MMA Construction and Development Corp.—earned him a standing in the business community, and his involvement in the ARMM Social Fund Project enhanced his credentials in public service.

Two years after his father's death, on 2006 Adiong Jr. was named as member of the government panel's Coordinating Committee on Cessation of Hostilities, representing the business community of the Autonomous Region in Muslim Mindanao-Social Fund Project (ARMM-SFP).

Aiming to continue his father's legacy, he and his running mate Former Department of the Interior and Local Government-ARMM Regional Secretary Datu RPK Arsad Marohombsar won the 2007 Philippine general election as the governor and vice governor of the province against the tandem of Marawi City Mayor Solitario Ali and Assemblyman Jamil Lucman, Lanao del Sur 2nd District Congressman Benasing Jun Macarambon and incumbent Vice Governor Monera Dimakuta-Macabangon, and incumbent Lanao del Sur Governor Aleem Bashier Manalao of Ompia Party.

On 2010 Philippine general election, he was re-elected as the Governor against his nemesis, former Marawi Mayor Solitario Ali.

On 2016, he was elected as Vice-Governor and was succeeded by his mother, Soraya Alonto Adiong as Governor of the province of Lanao del Sur. 

On February 17, 2023, he was injured by unidentified gunmen in an ambush on the governor's car convoy in del Sur. Four people were killed during the attack.

References

Living people
Governors of Lanao del Sur
People from Marawi
Filipino Muslims
1965 births